Hildegard Woodward (February 10, 1898 – December 1977) was the author and illustrator of many children's books, two of which were awarded a Caldecott Honor. Woodward's art was not restricted to children's books; her portfolio includes numerous works of fiction and humor for adults.

She was born in Worcester, Massachusetts February 10, 1898. Her parents were Rufus and Stella Woodward. She was educated at the School of the Museum of Fine Arts, Boston and in Paris.

In 1948 she was given a Caldecott Medal for her illustrations of Roger and the Fox written by Lavinia R. Davis and again in 1950 for The Wild Birthday Cake.

In 1953 Woodward painted a mural on the wall of the Center School cafeteria in Brookfield, Connecticut near her residence in Hawleyville.

She began to lose her sight in the 1960, but didn't stop painting. When she went blind she developed a method of "painting by touch".

Woodward never married or had children. She died in December 1977 in Connecticut.

Her papers are held at the University of Southern Mississippi and the Children's Literature Research Collection at the University of Minnesota house copies of her original artwork.

Bibliography
 Little World-Children (Ginn, 1928) — written by Elizabeth Ellis Scantlebury
 The Blue Teapot: Sandy Cove Stories (The Macmillan Company, 1931) — written by Alice Dalgliesh
 P-Penny and His Little Red Cart (Lothrop, Lee & Shepard Co., 1934) — written by Amy Wentworth Stone 
 Everyday Children (Oxford University Press, 1935)
 In Storyland (Lothrop, Lee and Shepard Co., 1936) — written by Ruth Irma Low 
 Here's Juggins (Lothrop, Lee and Shepard, 1936) — written by Amy Wentworth Stone
 Little Miss Capo (Macmillan, 1937) — written by Frances Gaither
 Exploring New Fields (Houghton Mifflin Company, 1938) — written by Beryl Parker; Julia M Harris; Hildegard Woodward; P O Palmstrom
 It Happened in England (Albert Whitman, 1939) — written by Marian King
 The Chosen Baby (Carrick and Evans, 1939) — written by Valentina Pavlovna Wasson
 Yammy Buys a Bicycle (Albert Whitman & Co, 1940) — written by Bernice Morgan Bryant
 Jared's Blessing (Charles Scribner's Sons, 1942)
 Roundabout, Another Sandy Cove Story (Macmillan, 1942) — written by Alice Dalgliesh 
 Round Robin (Charles Scribner's Sons, 1943) — written by Lavinia R. Davis
 Country Neighborhood (The Macmillan Company, 1944) — written by Elizabeth Jane Coatsworth
 Roger and the Fox (Doubleday & Co., 1947) — written by Alice Dalgliesh; 1948 Caldecott Honor
 Christmas: A Book of Stories Old and New (Charles Scribner's Sons, 1950) — Written by Alice Dalgliesh
 The Wild Birthday Cake (Doubleday and Company, 1949) — Written by Lavinia R Davis; 1950 Caldecott Honor
 Philippe's Hill (Doubleday, 1950) — written by Lee Kingman 
 Summer Is Fun (Doubleday, 1951) — written by Lavinia R. Davis
 Danny's Luck (Doubleday, Jan 1, 1953) — written by Lavinia R. Davis
 The Wonderful Story of How You Were Born (Hanover House, 1953) — written by Sidonie Matsne Gruenberg
 America Travels (Macmillan, 1961) — written by Alice Dalgliesh
 The House On Grandfather's Hill (Charles Scribner's Sons, 1961)
 Time Was Charles Scribner's Sons, 1962)
 Fruit is Ripe for Timothy (Young Scott Book, 1963) — written by Alice Rothschild

References

External links

Woodward on Kirkus Reviews
Twenty-seventh annual exhibition of painting: October the fifth through October the twenty-sixth, 1930
  (primarily previous page of browse report, under 'Woodward, Hildegard, 1898–' without '1977')

1898 births
1977 deaths
20th-century American writers
American children's book illustrators
American children's writers
School of the Museum of Fine Arts at Tufts alumni
Writers from Worcester, Massachusetts
20th-century American women writers